Cut is the debut studio album by English punk band the Slits, released on 7 September 1979. It was recorded at Ridge Farm Studios in Rusper and produced by Dennis Bovell. The album was praised by later acts such as Kurt Cobain and Massive Attack.

Composition 
Musically, Cut works in an "innovative" fusion of punk and reggae. It also incorporates "restless [and] offbeat" art pop.

Release and reception 

The album was originally released on 7 September 1979 on the Island Records label in the UK and on Antilles in the US. It reached number 30 on the UK album charts at the time. In 2004, it was voted 58th in The Observers 100 Greatest British Albums list. The album was also included in the book 1001 Albums You Must Hear Before You Die. In 2020, Rolling Stone ranked the album at number 260 in its list of the 500 greatest albums of all time.

Andy Kellman for AllMusic called it "entirely fun and catchy" despite its "less-than-polished nature and street-tough ruggedness". Robert Christgau applauded it, writing that "for once" there was "a white reggae style that rival[ed] its models for weirdness and formal imagination."

Cuts mark has been noted on several musical movements. "A post-punk masterpiece", it paved the genre's direction alongside fellow 1979 releases the Pop Group's Y and PiL's Metal Box. The Guardians Lindesay Irvine saw the album explore "adventurous" sonics while maintaining a "defiant" attitude. This included a full embrace of Jamaican music influences, with which he credited the Slits as one of the first bands to do so. Indeed, PopMatters felt that Cut spoke to post-punk's appropriation of dub and reggae clearer than any other of the genre's records. Irvine argued that it inspired later post-punk acts like Culture Club to "[get] their nerve up". PopMatters said that Cuts most influential aspect was singer Ari Up's "wailing vibrato and gnashing power" that would be revamped during the movement. 

Cut is credited with shaping the 1990s musical movement riot grrrl. Rolling Stone wrote that the scene's bands Bikini Kill and Sleater-Kinney came to be because of it. 

Bands to whom Cut has been appreciated by and/or influential to include Sleater-Kinney and trip hop group Massive Attack. In his posthumously released journals, Nirvana frontman Kurt Cobain listed
Cut (as "Typical Girls") as one of his 50 favorite records of all time.

Accolades

Reissues 
Cut was re-released on CD in Europe in 1990 and in 2000 within the Island Master series (IMCD 90 and IMCD 275). In 2004, Koch Records licensed the master to Cut from Island Def Jam (who still held the rights to the album) and reissued the album on CD for the first time ever in the United States; previously, the album had been only available to Stateside fans on CD as an English import, since the album's original American release (on the Island subsidiary Antilles, during Island's association with Warner Bros. Records) had long since gone out of print.

In 2009, Island Records released a two-disc 30th Anniversary Deluxe Edition consisting of the remastered original album plus bonus tracks and selections from the band's appearances on BBC's John Peel Sessions on the first disc and a second disc entitled "unCut" with demos and alternate mixes.

Track listing 
All tracks written by Viv Albertine, Tessa Pollitt, Ariane Forster (aka Ari Up) and Paloma Romero (aka Palmolive).

Side one 
 "Instant Hit" – 2:43
 "So Tough" – 2:41
 "Spend, Spend, Spend" – 3:18
 "Shoplifting" – 1:39
 "FM" – 3:35

Side two 
 "Newtown" – 3:48
 "Ping Pong Affair" (stylized as "ƃuoԀ ƃuᴉԀ Affair" on the record sleeve) – 4:16
 "Love und Romance" – 2:27
 "Typical Girls" – 3:57
 "Adventures Close to Home" – 3:28

Bonus tracks
 "I Heard It Through the Grapevine" (Barrett Strong, Norman Whitfield) - 3:59
 "Liebe and Romanze" (Slow Version) - 4:45

2009 deluxe edition 

Disc 1
 "Instant Hit"
 "So Tough"
 "Spend, Spend, Spend"
 "Shoplifting"
 "FM"
 "Newtown"
 "Ping Pong Affair"
 "Love und Romance"
 "Typical Girls"
 "Adventures Close to Home"
 "I Heard It Through the Grapevine"
 "Liebe and Romanze" (Slow Version)
 "Typical Girls" (Brink Style Dub)
 "Love and Romance" (John Peel Session 19/09/1977)
 "Vindictive" (John Peel Session 19/09/1977)
 "Newtown" (John Peel Session 19/09/1977)
 "Shoplifting" (John Peel Session 19/09/1977)
 "So Tough" (John Peel Session 17/04/1978)
 "Instant Hit" (John Peel Session 17/04/1978)
 "FM" (John Peel Session 17/04/1978)

Disc 2
 "I Heard It Through the Grapevine" (Demo)
 "Instant Hit" (8-Track Demo)
 "Spend, Spend, Spend" (8-Track Demo)
 "Newtown" (8-Track Demo)
 "Adventures Close to Home" (8-Track Demo)
 "Instant Hit" (Rough Mix)
 "So Tough" (Rough Mix)
 "Spend, Spend, Spend" (Toast Version)
 "Shoplifting" (Rough Mix)
 "FM" (Rough Mix)
 "Newtown" (Rough Mix)
 "Ping Pong Affair" (Rough Mix)
 "Love und Romance" (Rough Mix)
 "Typical Girls" (Rough Mix)
 "Adventures Close to Home" (Rough Mix)
 "So Tough" (Outtake)
 "Instant Hit" (Instrumental Outtake)
 "Typical Girls" (Instrumental Outtake)
 "Spend, Spend, Spend" (Dub Version)
 "In the Beginning, There Was Rhythm" (Early Version)

Personnel 
The Slits
 Ari Up – vocals
 Viv Albertine – guitar
 Tessa Pollitt – bass guitar
with:
 Budgie – drums
 Bruce Smith – uncredited voice on "Love und Romance"
 Dennis Bovell – sound effects
 Max "Maxi" Edwards – drums on "I Heard It Through the Grapevine"
 Neneh Cherry – uncredited backing vocals
Technical
Mike Dunne – engineer
Pennie Smith – photography
Brian Gaylor, Viv Albertine – innersleeve cartoons
Rema, Stuart Henderson, the Slits – production on "I Heard It Through the Grapevine"

References

External links 
"How we made 'Cut'", 24 June 2013 article in The Guardian.
Rolling Stone: 40 Greatest Punk Albums of All Time

Further reading 
 
 Howe, Zoë (2009) Typical Girls? The Story Of The Slits. Omnibus Press. 

The Slits albums
1979 debut albums
Island Records albums